Amo non amo (internationally released as Together? and I Love You, I Love You Not) is a 1979 Italian drama film directed by Armenia Balducci, a screenwriter and TV documentarian at her feature debut. The Italian progressive rock band Goblin created the original soundtrack for the film before it was re-scored by Burt Bacharach for its US release. RCA Victor subsequently released his soundtrack album. Not to mention also with several reissues of Goblin's initial (more preferred) score by AMS on both CD and Vinyl.

Cast 
Jacqueline Bisset: Louise
Maximilian Schell: John
Terence Stamp: Henry
Monica Guerritore: Giulia
Luca Venantini: Luca
Pietro Biondi: Berto
Birgit Hamer: blond girl
Francesca De Sapio: Francesca
Serena Canevari: Serena
Umberto Orsini

References

External links

1979 films
English-language Italian films
Italian drama films
Films scored by Goblin (band)
1979 drama films
1979 directorial debut films
1970s English-language films
1970s Italian films